The Somerset Dam is a mass concrete gravity dam with a gated spillway across the Stanley River in Queensland, Australia. It is within the locality of Somerset Dam in the Somerset Region in South East Queensland. The main purpose of the dam is the supply of potable water for the Brisbane, Gold Coast and Logan City regions. Additionally, the dam provides for flood mitigation, recreation and for the generation of hydroelectricity. The impounded reservoir is called Lake Somerset.

The dam, lake and surrounding village of Somerset are named in honour of Henry Plantagenet Somerset, a local grazier and Member of the Legislative Assembly of Queensland who represented the seat of Stanley from 1904 until 1920.

Location and features

The  dam wall holds back the  reservoir when at full capacity. However, only  is used for water supply and the remainder used for flood mitigation. Built under the supervision of the Bureau of Industry, management of the dam was transferred to SEQ Water in July 2008 as part of a water security project in the South East Queensland region, known as the South East Queensland Water Grid. A small  hydroelectric power station is located adjacent to the dam wall.

A water level of 90% is the optimum capacity for keeping evaporation rates to a minimum. Dam operators discharge water into the Wivenhoe Dam downstream to hold Somerset at this level when inflows are occurring.

The dam is home to the Somerset Dam Power Station.

Construction
The site was first suggested for the location of a dam by Henry Somerset, the owner of Caboonbah Homestead, after the 1893 Brisbane floods caused severe damage to Brisbane River valley residents downstream. A commission of enquiry recommended Stanley Gorge as the site for a dam in 1928, but it was not until 1933 that the Forgan Smith Labor Government adopted the reservoir's construction as a major job creation project to counter job losses caused by the Great Depression.

Construction began in 1935. Worker's cottages had to be built and other facilities were constructed to attract  construction workers and their families to the area. By 1942 the dam was almost complete when workers were diverted to the war effort, with many being redeployed to construct the Cairncross Dockyard in Brisbane. Work on the dam recommenced in 1948. Opened in 1953 when structural work was finished, it was not until 1958 that the dam was officially named after Henry Somerset and the next year before all work related to the dam, including the hydroelectric power station was complete.

Recreation

There are two public access areas on Somerset Dam, Kirkleigh and The Spit. Both locations have multi-lane, concrete boat ramps with facilities for day-trippers. Camping is permitted and caravans are catered for at Kirkleigh and below the dam wall at Somerset Park in the small town of Somerset Dam. During busy periods the two camping locations can be filled to capacity with room for a maximum of 2,200 campers at Kirkleigh and 800 at Somerset Park. Lake Somerset Holiday Park's Kirkleigh campground also features cabin accommodation at the waterfront and direct access to the dam from a grassy spit. The dam contains  of navigable waterway.

Fishing
The lake is a popular fishing destination, one of the top five fishing spots in the state. Fish species found in the dam include Australian bass, golden perch, silver perch, bony bream, eel-tailed catfish, spangled perch, Mary River cod, snub nosed gar, Queensland lungfish and saratoga. A stocked impoundment permit is required to fish in the dam.

Engineering heritage award 
The dam is listed as an Engineering Heritage National Landmark by Engineers Australia as part of its Engineering Heritage Recognition Program.

See also

List of dams in Queensland

References

Further reading

External links

 Current dam level
 Lake Somerset Fishing Information, Map, pictures & Water Level Gauge

 Somerset Tourism Natural Attractions

Buildings and structures in Somerset Region
Somerset, Lake
Gravity dams
Somerset Dam
Dams completed in 1959
1959 establishments in Australia
Energy infrastructure completed in 1959
Recipients of Engineers Australia engineering heritage markers